The 2021 Papua New Guinea National Soccer League, for sponsorship reasons also known as the Kumul Petroleum Holdings Limited National Soccer League, is the 15th edition of the Papua New Guinea National Soccer League, the top-tier football league in Papua New Guinea. The league started on 24 July.

The defending champions are Lae City, who won their sixth consecutive title with a 1–0 victory over Vitiaz United in the previous season's Grand Final.

Format
After initially deciding the league format would be the same as the previous season – one national league consisting of ten teams – the Papua New Guinea Football Association and NSL board eventually reverted to a format that they had previously used in the 2015–16 season, splitting the league into two regional divisions, a Northern Conference and a Southern Conference, each with seven teams.

Clubs
Seven clubs returned from the previous season: six-time reigning champions Lae City, eight-time champions Hekari United, fourth-placed side Komara Gulf, Morobe United, Morobe Wawens, Star Mountain and Tusbab Stallions. Grand Final runners-up Vitiaz United withdrew, citing financial difficulties. Kutubu and Bougainville also withdrew from the league.  A phoenix side, Lae City Dwellers, led by sacked Lae City FC coach Peter Gunemba, announced their return to the league in May 2021, although there was an element of confusion as to which of the two sides had the right to claim the franchise's previous titles. There were returns to the league for Tavur FC (also known as WNB Tavur), Sepik FC, and Port Moresby Strikers (also known as Southern Strikers), while Central Dabari FC  was a late acceptance into the league. There was also room for two development sides in each of the conferences.

References

Football in Papua New Guinea
2021 in Papua New Guinean sport